Sunehray Din is a Pakistani television series produced and directed by Shoaib Mansoor and Mohsin Ali under Shoman Productions. The series was co-produced by ISPR. It ran on Pakistan Television Corporation in 1991. The series stars Saleem Sheikh, Mumtaz Musharraf and Alia Kazmi in leading roles and revolves around the lives of the young cadets of Pakistan Military Academy.

In 1998, the series was followed by a sequel titled Alpha Bravo Charlie which was also directed by Mansoor.

Cast  
 Saleem Sheikh as Safeer
 Azra Mansoor as Safeer's mother
 Malik Faraz Inam as Faraz
 Hameed Wain as Safeer's grandfather
 Mumtaz Musharraf
 Alia Kazmi

References

External links 
 

1991 television series debuts
1991 television series endings
Pakistani television series